Schutzmannschaft-Brigade Siegling (also ) was a Belarusian Auxiliary Police brigade formed by Nazi Germany in July 1944 in East Prussia, from members of six local volunteer battalions of Schutzmannschaft following the Soviet Operation Bagration. The six retreating collaborationist units who joined Siegling included Bataillon 57 (ukrainische), Bataillon 60 (weißruthenische), Bataillon 61, 62, 63 (ukrainische), and Bataillon 64 (weißruthenische).

Background

Most members of the Schutzmannschaft-Brigade Siegling originated from the pro-Nazi Belarusian Home Defence (BKA). The total number of soldiers evacuated by the Nazis to East Prussia from across Belarus during the Soviet advance might have reached 10,000. They regrouped northeast of Warsaw in occupied Poland, under the command of SS-Obersturmbannführer Hans Siegling who was also the SS-and-Police leader of the White Ruthenia. The new Brigade consisted of 4 rifle regiments as well as artillery and cavalry unit. It was renamed by Himmler in August 1944, as the 30th Waffen-Grenadier-Division der SS (russische Nr. 2). It consisted of men from the former Soviet Union, mainly from Belarus, including whole Kommandanturas of Bielaruskaja Krajovaja Abarona (BKA) and participants in Vlasov's movement, but also units of the German Sicherheitspolizei (SiPo), Sicherheitsdienst (SD), and Ordnungsdienst from the area.

By November 1944, the battalion whose formation started in August originally – as the Schuma Brigade Siegling – was transported to France as the 30th Waffen Grenadier Division of the SS (2nd Russian). While in France, the brigade remained under the leadership of Obersturmbannführer Hans Siegling. By February 10, 1945 the formation was nearly wiped out by mass Belarusian desertion and by the Allies. Only one regiment was left. Some reinforcements came from other formations, but not enough. The battalion was renamed again as the 30th SS Grenadier Division (1st White Ruthenian) or Weißruthenische Nr. 1 (in German), but in April 1945, it was entirely disbanded.

Formation of Schuma Brigade Siegling

The German forces along with the Ukrainian, Belarusian, and Russian collaborators under the German command were pushed out from the Belorussian SSR during the Soviet Operation Bagration of August 1944. They gradually retreated west from the GK Weißruthenien (as it was called then) toward occupied eastern Poland between June 22 and August 19, 1944. Dozens of units remained scattered around. The German forces included remnants of the  SiPo, SD, and Ordnungsdienst. Among them, was also units of Byelorussian Home Defence (BKA) and the Belarusian Kommandantura personnel. At the end of June 1944 the SS commander Curt von Gottberg issued an order to create the Schutzmannschaft-Brigade Siegling which by July 20, 1944 was formed and prepared for duty.

The formation of the brigade's four regiments was completed by July 31, 1944 – all 4 regiments were named after their commanders were stationed at that time at different places: 1st Regiment at Grady under command of Sturmbannführer Hans Österreich, 2nd regiment at Stawicz - commander Sturmbannführer Helmuth Gantz, 3rd regiment at Czartoriak – commander Sturmbannführer Wilhelm Mocha and 4th regiment – commander Sturmbannführer Ernst Schmidt. Artillery unit was stationed at Suliny. Brigade also has a cavalry unit. Approximate number of the personnel is estimated as follows: up to 6 thousand auxiliary Ordnungspolizei, 2 thousand SD men, and up to 8 thousand members of the BKA. They were spread over many locations in East Prussia.

Schutzmannschaft-Brigade Siegling in its full formation operated in Belarus from late July 1944. In August 1944 (possibly earlier) an order was issued to form a division formation from Brigade Siegling - thus all personnel was transferred from the rank-and-file of the Ordnungspolizei formations to the SS command. Under the new leadership, the brigade was renamed as the 30th Waffen Grenadier Division of the SS (2nd Russian) on August 18, 1944. The Division was composed of the following regiments: Waffen-Gren.Rgt. d. SS 75 (russ. Nr. 4), Waffen-Gren.Rgt. d. SS 76 (russ. Nr. 5) (consisted of three battalions each), Waffen-Artillerie-Rgt d. SS 30 (russ. Art.Rgt. 2) (consisted of three artillery batteries) and Replacement Regiment were created.  The combat-ready units of the Brigade Siegling were transferred to France to participate in operations against the French Resistance.

The transfer of all units in a brigade-size formation to France was decided under general command of Obersturmbannführer Hans Siegling. Siegling led dozens of Nazi security warfare operations in Belarus since 1941 as the commander of the 57th Schuma regiment (Schutzmannschaft Bataillon 57).

On 6 August 1944, the unit received an order to take part in the suppression of the Warsaw Uprising, however, the idea was abandoned. Instead, it was used from August 12 in East Prussia for the harvest collection. Some combat ready units of the brigade were transferred to France in August 1944 fight against the French Resistance.

See also 
 29th Waffen Grenadier Division of the SS RONA (1st Russian)
 30th Waffen Grenadier Division of the SS (2nd Russian)
 Holocaust in Belarus
 Belarusian Auxiliary Police
 Schutzmannschaft Battalion 118, joint operations

References

Bibliography 
 Leonid Rein: "Untermenschen in SS Uniforms: 30th Waffen-Grenadier Division of Waffen SS", The Journal of Slavic Military Studies, 1556–3006, Volume 20, Issue 2, 2007, Pages 329—345
 Bishop C. Zagraniczne formacje SS. Zagraniczni ochotnicy w Waffen-SS w latach 1940–1945. Warszawa, 2006

The Holocaust in Belarus
Ukrainian collaborators with Nazi Germany
Belarusian collaborators with Nazi Germany
Police forces of Nazi Germany
The Holocaust in Poland
Military history of Germany during World War II
Local participation in the Holocaust
Schutzmannschaft
Waffen-SS brigades
Military units and formations established in 1944
Military units and formations disestablished in 1945